Ezra Brainerd (December 17, 1844 – December 8, 1924) was president of Middlebury College, Vermont, United States, from 1885 until 1908.

Born in St. Albans, Vermont, Brainerd was a graduate of the college in 1864. Brainerd assumed the presidency at a time when the college was recovering from an extended period of hardship. Brainerd remained president for 23 years, during which time the student body doubled, Starr Library and Warner Hall were constructed, and the college changed from an almost exclusively local college into a more regionally oriented institution. Brainerd was an educator with diverse interests, teaching in almost every subject, from physics to mathematics, to English and rhetoric. He was especially interested in botany; his papers and letters are in several herbaria and libraries throughout New England and the East. Brainerd's diverse talents and interests also informed his educational philosophy. Brainerd focused his efforts on strengthening and broadening the education offered by Middlebury rather than enforcing discipline and religion.

In 1995, when Middlebury initiated a system of residential commons, Brainerd Commons was named in his honor.

A type of Hawthorn, Crataegus brainerdii, is named in his honor.

References

External links
 Past Middlebury Presidents at www.middlebury.edu
 Brainerd Commons at www.middlebury.edu

Middlebury College alumni
Presidents of Middlebury College
1844 births
1924 deaths
People from Franklin County, Vermont